Mellow Mellow is a Japanese idol girl group formed in 2017. They released their debut single, "Girls Hour", on December 6, 2017.

History
Prior to debuting in Mellow Mellow, Sena and Mami were members of Sunmyu. The group debuted in December 2017, with the single "Girls Hour". They made their major label debut with their second single, "Magic Rendezvous", in June 2018. Their third single, "Kimi ni Tap", was released in December 2018. In 2019, they released their fourth single "Dear My Star" and fifth single "Waning Moon". Their sixth single, "Saikō Kessaku", was released in July 2020.

Discography

Singles

References

External links
Official website

Japanese girl groups
Japanese idol groups
Japanese pop music groups
Musical groups from Tokyo
Musical groups established in 2017
2017 establishments in Japan